Fitzwillia is a genus of flowering plants in the family Asteraceae described as a genus in 1989.

There is only one known species, Fitzwillia axilliflora, endemic to Western Australia.

References

Gnaphalieae
Monotypic Asteraceae genera
Flora of Western Australia
Taxa named by Philip Sydney Short